The Lover of Madame Vidal (French: L'amant de Madame Vidal) is a 1936 French comedy film directed by André Berthomieu and starring Elvire Popesco, Victor Boucher and Jacques Louvigny. When she wrongly believes that her husband is having an affair, Madame Vidal hires a man to pose as her own lover.

It was based on a 1928 play of the same name by Louis Verneuil. The film's sets were designed by Jean d'Eaubonne.

Cast
 Elvire Popesco as Catherine Vidal  
 Victor Boucher as Philippe Marcelin 
 Jacques Louvigny as Monsieur Vidal  
 Hugues de Bagratide 
 Paul Demange 
 Pierre Etchepare as de Brézolles  
 Louis Florencie as Monsieur Giroux  
 Simone Mareuil as Suzanne  
 Mireille Perrey as Françoise Charny  
 Robert Seller
 Jean Témerson as Guillaume - le domestique

References

Bibliography 
 Goble, Alan. The Complete Index to Literary Sources in Film. Walter de Gruyter, 1999.

External links 
 

1936 comedy films
French comedy films
1936 films
1930s French-language films
Films based on works by Louis Verneuil
Films directed by André Berthomieu
French black-and-white films
1930s French films